Eveline may refer to:

 Eveline (given name)
 "Eveline" (short story), a short story by James Joyce
 Eveline, Missouri, United States
 Eveline Street, in Windhoek, Namibia
 Eveline Township, Michigan, United States

See also
 Evelyn (disambiguation)